Ilia Sulamanidze (born 18 June 2001) is a Georgian judoka. He won one of the bronze medals in the men's 100 kg event at the 2021 World Judo Championships held in Budapest, Hungary.

In April 2021, he lost his bronze medal match in the men's 100 kg event at the European Judo Championships held in Lisbon, Portugal.

He won the 2021 rising star award at the 2021 Judo Awards.

He won the gold medal in his event at the 2022 Judo Grand Slam Tel Aviv held in Tel Aviv, Israel.

References

External links
 
 
 

Living people
2001 births
Place of birth missing (living people)
Male judoka from Georgia (country)
Judoka at the 2018 Summer Youth Olympics
21st-century people from Georgia (country)